The 2009-10 Bahrain 2nd GP2 Asia round was the fourth and final round of the 2009-10 GP2 Asia Series season. It was held on March 13 and 14, 2010 at Bahrain International Circuit at Sakhir, Bahrain. It was the second of two rounds to be held at the circuit, the other being the 2009-10 Bahrain 1st GP2 Asia round. This event will support the 2010 Bahrain Grand Prix, and therefore use a different layout to an earlier race in the series, The Endurance Circuit. Luca Filippi started from pole position, won the race (first win for MalaysiaQi-Meritus.com and set fastest lap, forming a perfect weekend. Sprint race was won by Filippi's countryman Giacomo Ricci, which also brought the first victory for his team DPR.

This was the last race for the original GP2 car, the Dallara GP2/05, as it was replaced by the Dallara GP2/11 for 2011.

Classification

Qualifying

Race 1

Race 2

References

External links
2009–10 2nd Bahrain GP2 Asia round on paddock.gp2series.com

GP2 Asia
GP2 Asia Series